Yadayim (Hebrew: ידיים, "hands") is a tractate of the Mishnah and the Tosefta, dealing with the impurity of the hands and their ablution. It is eleventh in the order Tohorot in most editions of the Mishnah.

Mishnah
In the Mishnah, Yadayim is divided into four chapters, containing 22 paragraphs in all.
Chapter 1: The quantity of water necessary to purify the hands by pouring it over them (§ 1); the vessels from which the water may be poured over the hands (§ 2); kinds of water which may not be used to purify the hands, and persons who may perform the act of manual ablution (§§ 3-5).
Chapter 2: How the water should be poured over the hands, and the first and second ablutions (§§ 1-3); the hands are regarded as pure in all cases where doubt exists as to whether the ablution was properly performed (§ 4).
Chapter 3: Things which render the hands impure; the canonical books make the hands impure. The holy writings were kept together with the equally sacred heave offering ("terumah") of the priests, and were injured by mice; to prevent this it was enacted that the holy writings defiled the hands as well as the heave-offering, thus leading to a discontinuance of the custom of keeping them together; discussion of the question whether the Song of Solomon and Ecclesiastes are canonical, and thus render the hands impure; on the day of the election of Eleazar ben Azariah as nasi these books were declared canonical.
Chapter 4: Other verdicts rendered on the same day in which the Song of Solomon and Ecclesiastes were declared canonical, these rulings being corollaries of that decision (§ 1-4); the Aramaic language in Ezra and Daniel, the ancient Hebrew writing ("ketav Ivri"), and dissensions between Pharisees and Sadducees (§§ 5-8).

Tosefta
The Tosefta to this tracte is divided into two chapters. In addition to amplifications of the Mishnaic teachings, it contains various interesting maxims, of which the following may be mentioned:
 "The book of Ben Sira and all books of later date are no longer canonical" (2:13).
 The "Tovlei Shacharit" (= "Morning Immersers") said to the Pharisees: "We reproach you for uttering the Holy Name before your bodies have been purified of their impurities" (2:20).

References